The politics of Uruguay abide by a presidential representative democratic republic, under which the President of Uruguay is both the head of state and the head of government, as well as a multiform party system. The president exercises executive power and legislative power and is vested in the two chambers of the General Assembly of Uruguay. The Judiciary is independent from the executive and legislature.

The Colorado and National parties have been locked in a power struggle, with the predominance of the Colorado party throughout most of Uruguay's history. The 2004 election, however, brought the Encuentro Progresista-Frente Amplio-Nueva Mayoría, a coalition of socialists, former Tupamaros, communists, social democrats, and Christian Democrats among others to power with majorities in both houses of parliament. A majority vote elected President Tabaré Vázquez.

In 2009, the Broad Front once again won the elections with a plurality of the votes. A presidential runoff was triggered because their candidate, José Mujica, received only 47.96 percent of the vote. The Broad Front's candidate beat former president Luis Alberto Lacalle Herrera of the Nacional Party in the second round of voting. In addition to the presidency, the Broad Front won a simple majority in the Uruguayan Senate and Chamber of Representatives. In 2014, former president Tabaré Vázquez retook power after defeating, in a second round, the candidate of the National Party, Luis Lacalle Pou, who would be the winner of the 2019 election, surpassing the socialist Daniel Martínez with 50.79 to 49.2 percent of the vote.

History 

Until 1919, and from 1934 to 1952, Uruguay's political system, based on the 1830 Constitution, was presidential with a strong executive power, similar to that of the United States (but centralized and not federal). It was also characterized by the rivalry between the two traditional parties, the Colorado Party, liberal, and the Blanco Party (or National Party), conservative. Historically, the whites represented the interests of rural property, the Church and the military hierarchy, while colorados were supported by urban movable property and reformist intellectuals.

In the 19th century, the country had similar characteristics to other Latin American countries: caudillism, civil wars and permanent instability (40 revolts between 1830 and 1903), foreign capitalism's control of important sectors of the economy, high percentage of illiterate people (more than half the population in 1900), land oligarchy, etc. Yet Montevideo became a refuge for Argentine exiles fleeing the dictatorship of Juan Manuel de Rosas and maintained a reputation as a welcoming place for ideas of "advanced" political and social protest. In 1842, the newspaper Le Messager devoted a special issue to the memory of Charles Fourier. During the Great War (1843-1852), Garibaldi's red shirts fought in Montevideo even against Rosas' attacking forces. In 1875, workers founded an Internationale.

At the beginning of the 20th century, Uruguay became the most politically and socially advanced state on the continent. The liberal José Batlle y Ordóñez (in power between 1903 and 1907, then between 1911 and 1915) was the main architect of this transformation; freedom of expression and the press was affirmed, as well as that of suffrage. A system of proportional representation is adopted to allow for the representation of minorities. It also calls for the abolition of the death penalty, the fight against administrative corruption and the introduction of secularism and women's right to vote.

On the economic level, he stated that "industry must not be allowed to destroy human beings, but that on the contrary the State must regulate it in order to make the lives of the masses happier." It thus undertakes an economic policy of a dirigiste nature and nationalizes many sectors of the economy (railways, telephone, electricity, etc.). The "batllism" also takes the form of social measures: institutionalization of free and compulsory primary education, support for trade unions and recognition of the right to strike, maternity leave, an eight-hour day, etc. All this legislation, which was well advanced at the time, made Uruguay a progressive social democracy.

Constitution

Uruguay adopted its first constitution in 1830, following the conclusion of a three-year war in which Argentina and Uruguay fought as a regional federation: the United Provinces of the Río de la Plata. Sponsored by the United Kingdom, the 1828 Treaty of Montevideo built the foundations for a Uruguayan state and constitution. A constitution proposed under the military dictatorship government was rejected by a referendum in 1980.

Executive branch 

Uruguay's Constitution of 1967 created a strong presidency, subject to legislative and judicial balance. Many of these provisions were suspended in 1973 but reestablished in 1985.  The president, who is both the head of state and the head of government, is elected by popular vote for a five-year term, with the vice president elected on the same ticket. The President must act together with the Council of Ministers, which comprises cabinet ministers, appointed by the president. Thirteen ministers head various executive departments. The ministers can be removed by the General Assembly by a majority vote.

The Constitution amendment establishes the requirements for becoming President. Article 151 establishes that the President must be a natural-born citizen of the country, or have been born to an Uruguayan citizen if born abroad. The President must also be at least 35 years old and be registered in the National Civic Registry. The current president since 1 March 2020 is Luis Lacalle Pou, the son of the 36th president, Luis Alberto Lacalle.

Legislative branch

The General Assembly (Asamblea General) has two chambers. The Chamber of Representatives (Cámara de Representantes) has 99 members, elected for a five-year term by proportional representation with at least two members per department. The Chamber of Senators (Cámara de Senadores) has 31 members; 30 members are elected for a five-year term by proportional representation and the Vice-president who presides over it.

Judicial branch

The Judiciary of Uruguay is headed by the Supreme Court of Justice, whose members are appointed by the General Assembly through a two-thirds majority and whose terms last ten years. The Supreme Court of Justice is the last instance of appeal and is also in charge of judging the constitutionality of the laws. The judiciary is also made up of Courts of Appeals, Legal Courts and Peace Courts.

Direct democracy
The Uruguayan political system allows citizens to use direct democracy mechanisms to directly take political decisions on the current legal system without intermediaries. These mechanisms are the referendums to repeal recently approved laws, plebiscites to propose changes to the Constitution and the power of citizens to drive popular initiatives such as to propose referendums, to propose law drafts to the Parliament, to reform the Constitution and to deal with departmental matters.

Political parties and elections

International organization participation
Uruguay or Uruguayan organizations participate in the following international organizations: 
 The Food and Agriculture Organization (FAO)
 Group of 77 (G-77)
 Inter-American Development Bank (IADB)
 International Atomic Energy Agency (IAEA)
 International Bank for Reconstruction and Development (World Bank)
 International Civil Aviation Organization (ICAO)
 International Criminal Court (ICC)
 International Chamber of Commerce (ICC)
 International Red Cross
 International Fund for Agricultural Development (IFAD)
 International Finance Corporation (IFC)
 International Federation of Red Cross and Red Crescent Societies (IFRCS)
 International Hydrographic Organization (IHO)
 International Labour Organization (ILO)
 International Monetary Fund (IMF)
 International Maritime Organization (IMO)
 Interpol
 International Olympic Committee (IOC)
 International Organization for Migration (IOM)
 International Organization for Standardization (ISO)
 International Telecommunication Union (ITU)
 Latin American Economic System (LAES)
 Latin American Integration Association (LAIA)
 Mercosur
 United Nations Mission for the Referendum in Western Sahara (MINURSO)
 United Nations Organization Mission in the Democratic Republic of the Congo (MONUC)
 Non-Aligned Movement (NAM) (observer)
 Organization of American States (OAS)
 Agency for the Prohibition of Nuclear Weapons in Latin America and the Caribbean (OPANAL)
 Organisation for the Prohibition of Chemical Weapons (OPCW)
 Permanent Court of Arbitration (PCA)
 Rio Group (RG)
 Union of South American Nations (UNASUR)
 United Nations
 United Nations Mission in Sierra Leone (UNAMSIL)
 United Nations Conference on Trade and Development (UNCTAD)
 United Nations Educational, Scientific, and Cultural Organization (UNESCO)
 United Nations Industrial Development Organization (UNIDO)
 United Nations Mission in Ethiopia and Eritrea (UNMEE)
 United Nations Mission of Support in East Timor (UNMISET)
 United Nations Military Observer Group in India and Pakistan (UNMOGIP)
 United Nations Mission of Observers in Tajikistan (UNMOT)
 United Nations Observer Mission in Georgia (UNOMIG)
 Universal Postal Union (UPU)
 World Confederation of Labour (WCL)
 World Customs Organization (WCO)
 World Federation of Trade Unions (WFTU)
 World Health Organization (WHO)
 World Intellectual Property Organization (WIPO)
 World Meteorological Organization (WMO)
 World Tourism Organization (WToO)
 World Trade Organization (WTO)

References

External links
 Official website
 Parliament of Uruguay
 Presidency of Uruguay
Political Data Bank at the Social Sciences School of the Universidad de la República (Uruguay)

Further reading
Revolution Through Reform: Popular Assemblies, Housing Cooperatives, and Uruguay’s New Left